The Well Below the Valley is the second album by the Irish folk group Planxty. It was recorded at Escape Studios in Kent, England, from 18 June 1973 until the end of the month, and was released later that year. It takes its title from the sixth song on the album, "The Well Below the Valley".

Track listing
All titles are Traditional, arranged by Planxty, except track 12.
"Cúnla" (song) – 3:54
"Pat Reilly" (song) – 3:15
"The Kid on the Mountain"/"An Phis Fhliuch" (slip jigs) – 3:49
"As I Roved Out (Andy)" (song) – 5:19 
"The Dogs Among the Bushes"/"Jenny's Wedding" (reels) – 2:37
"The Well Below the Valley" (song) – 5:30
"Hewlett" (waltz) – 2:30
"Bean Pháidin" (song) – 3:42
"The Fisherman's Lilt"/"Cronin's Hornpipe" (hornpipes) – 3:14
"As I Roved Out (Christy)" (song) – 3:49
"Humours of Ballyloughlin" (jig) – 2:11
"Time Will Cure Me" (song) – 5:23(Andy Irvine)

Personnel
Christy Moore - vocals, guitar, bodhrán
Andy Irvine - vocals, mandolin, bouzouki, harmonica
Dónal Lunny - bouzouki, vocals
Liam O'Flynn - uilleann pipes, tin whistle

References

1973 albums
Polydor Records albums
Planxty albums
Albums produced by Phil Coulter